Walnut Hill/Denton station is a DART station in Dallas, Texas. It is located in Northwest Dallas and serves DART's . The station opened as part of the Green Line's expansion in December 2010.

References

External links 
Dallas Area Rapid Transit - Walnut Hill/Denton Station

Dallas Area Rapid Transit light rail stations in Dallas
Railway stations in the United States opened in 2010
Railway stations in Dallas County, Texas